The Professional Performing Arts School, colloquially known as PPAS, is a public middle and high school in Hell's Kitchen, Manhattan, New York City.

History

PPAS was created in 1990 to meet the needs of two groups of students: those who wanted to pursue professional work in the arts as they earned a junior/senior high school diploma and those who wanted to study the arts as an avocation.

Notable alumni

Eddie Alderson, actor (Daytime Emmy Award nominee for One Life to Live)
Kristen Alderson, actress (Daytime Emmy Award winner for One Life to Live)
Nadia Azzi, pianist
Morena Baccarin, actress (Firefly, Primetime Emmy Award nominee for Homeland)
Andrea Bowen, actress (Desperate Housewives, Les Misérables)
Tru Collins, singer and actor (Trans-Siberian Orchestra)
Lana Condor, actress (To All the Boys I've Loved Before)
Monét X Change, drag queen, singer (Rupaul's Drag Race, RuPaul's Drag Race All Stars)
Billy Crawford, singer, actor and television Host (It's Showtime)
Julia Cumming, singer, songwriter, bassist (Sunflower Bean), model and activist
Claire Danes, actress (My So-Called Life, Primetime Emmy Award winner for Homeland)
Melonie Diaz, actress (Raising Victor Vargas, Fruitvale Station)
Max Ehrich, actor and dancer (Daytime Emmy Award nominee for The Young and the Restless)
Jesse Eisenberg, actor (Academy Award nominee for The Social Network)
Jessica Lee Goldyn, actress and dancer (A Chorus Line)
Sarah Hyland, actress (Modern Family, Lipstick Jungle)
Paul Iacono, actor and director (The Hard Times of RJ Berger, Fame)
Mark Indelicato, actor (Ugly Betty, White Bird in a Blizzard)
Alicia Keys, actress, singer and pianist (multiple Grammy Award winner)
Christy Knowings, actor, musician, writer and dancer (All That, Sesame Street)
Samantha Logan, actress (All American, 13 Reasons Why)
Jake Lucas, actor (Broadway production of Newsies, Peter Pan Live!, the 2015 Broadway revival of The King and I)
Gregori Lukas, singer and dancer (Recording Artist, The Nutcracker, New York City Ballet)
Paul McGill, actor and dancer (Bullets Over Broadway, Fame)
Taylor Momsen, actress and singer (Gossip Girl, The Pretty Reckless)
Asher Monroe, actor, dancer and singer (V Factory, Fame)
Christian Navarro, actor (Vinyl, 13 Reasons Why)
Eric Nelsen, actor and dancer (All My Children, 13: The Musical)
Connor Paolo, actor (Gossip Girl, Revenge)
Karina Pasian, singer and pianist (Grammy Award nominee for First Love)
Josh Peck, actor and comedian (Drake & Josh, The Amanda Show)
Justin Peck, dancer and choreographer (New York City Ballet)
Danielle Polanco, dancer and choreographer (Step Up film series)
Victor Rasuk, actor (How to Make it in America, Fifty Shades film series)
Alisa Reyes, actress (All That, The Proud Family)
Elena Satine, actress and singer (Magic City, Revenge)
Max Schneider, singer and actor (How To Rock, Rags)
Britney Spears, singer and dancer (Grammy Award winner)
Rebecca Harrell Tickell, actress, producer and director (Prancer, FUEL, The Big Fix)
Addison Timlin, actress (Derailed, Zero Hour)
Louie Torrellas, actor and comedian (Sponk!, Jumper)
Chris Trousdale, actor and singer (The Biggest Fan, Dream Street)
Daniel Ulbricht, dancer (New York City Ballet)
Jamila Velazquez, actor (Empire, Twisted)
Malina Weissman, actress (A Series of Unfortunate Events)
Jeremy Allen White, actor (Shameless, Twelve)
Lee Thompson Young, actor (The Famous Jett Jackson)
Aubrey Joseph, actor (Cloak and Dagger)
Ben Cook, Broadway actor
Dominique Thorne, actress (If Beale Street Could Talk, Judas and the Black Messiah)

References

Educational institutions established in 1990
Public high schools in Manhattan
Schools of the performing arts in the United States
Public middle schools in Manhattan
Hell's Kitchen, Manhattan
1990 establishments in New York City